Rabenhorst is a surname, and refers to the following:

People
  (1846-1925), German general
  (1801-1873), head of the Ministry of War of Saxony for 1849–1866
 Gottlob Ludwig Rabenhorst (1806-1881), German botanist and mycologist
  (b.1940), German diplomat
 Harry Rabenhorst (1898–1972), U.S. football player and coach
 Jan Rabenhorst, character in Mordshunger
 , German academic

Other
 , German fruit juice company
 , human settlement in Germany

Rabenhorst